Phascolosomatidae is a family of peanut worms. It is the only family in the order Phascolosomatida, which is in the class Phascolosomatidea.

Species

Antillesoma
 Antillesoma antillarum (Grübe & Oersted, 1858)

Apionsoma
 Apionsoma capitata (Gerould, 1913)
 Apionsoma misakianum (Ikeda, 1904)
 Apionsoma murinae (Cutler, 1969)
 Apionsoma pectinatum (Keferstein, 1867)
 Apionsoma trichocephala Sluiter, 1902

Phascolosoma
 Phascolosoma agassizii (Keferstein, 1866)
 Phascolosoma albolineatum (Baird, 1868)
 Phascolosoma annulatum (Hutton, 1879)
 Phascolosoma arcuatum (Gray, 1828)
 Phascolosoma glabrum (Sluiter, 1902)
 Phascolosoma granulatum (Leuckart, 1828)
 Phascolosoma lobostomum (Fischer, 1895)
 Phascolosoma maculatum (Sluiter, 1886)
 Phascolosoma meteori (Hérubel, 1904)
 Phascolosoma nigrescens (Keferstein, 1865)
 Phascolosoma noduliferum (Stimpson, 1855)
 Phascolosoma pacificum (Keferstein, 1866)
 Phascolosoma perlucens (Baird, 1868)
 Phascolosoma saprophagicum (Gibbs, 1987)
 Phascolosoma scolops (Selenka and de Man, 1883)
 Phascolosoma stephensoni (Stephen, 1942)
 Phascolosoma turnerae (Rice, 1985)

References

Sipunculans